Plumtree may refer to:

a plum tree

Places
Plumtree, California
Plumtree, North Carolina
Plumtree, Nottinghamshire
Plumtree, Zimbabwe
Plumtree School, Zimbabwe

Other
Plumtree (band), a band from Halifax, Canada
Plumtree Software
John Plumtree, South African rugby union coach